Rory and Paddy's Great British Adventure is a television documentary series presented by comedians Rory McGrath and Paddy McGuinness. The series was broadcast on Five between 13 August and 3 September 2008. The series follows McGrath and McGuinness travelling around Great Britain, taking part in "strange but quintessentially British sporting events". Examples of sports that appeared in the series include cheese rolling, pie eating, bog snorkelling, Eton Fives and Egg Throwing. A second series, Rory and Paddy's Even Greater British Adventure, began on 20 September 2010 and ended on 18 October 2010.

Plot
Rory and Paddy's Great British Adventure saw McGrath and McGuinness competing against both the public and themselves in unusual sports around Britain. For the first series, the contest was split into four parts: Middle England; Scotland and Northern England; Wales and the Shires; and Southern England. In each edition, McGrath and McGuinness go head-to-head at different sports, and also take part in a separate sport each. The results were recorded in their "Black book", with McGrath and McGuinness fighting each other to see who is best.

In the second series, the contest was split into six parts, with results recording their "Red book". The separate sports were removed from the show, so now each contest is a head-to-head between McGrath and McGuinness.

Reception
The series received mixed reviews. The programme was originally broadcast during the 2008 Summer Olympics, which resulted in some media outlets saying that Britain should play in sports depicted in the show, rather than actual Olympic events. Andrew Tong wrote in The Independent on Sunday that; "we mustn't play them at their own game. Rather we should regale them with all the sports we invented but which the IOC won't allow in the Olympics. Not cricket and rugby, but games at which we're the best in the world, such as toe wrestling, mountain bike bog snorkelling, egg throwing and, of course, worm charming."

Noam Friedlander in Metro gave the programme four stars out of five, saying: "The pair packed a lot into the hour but a swifter romp through Middle England would have been more welcome. At least the eccentricities that make Britain 'great' got their minutes of fame. It makes a change to give these genuine characters airtime rather than the caterwauling wannabes we'll be seeing on this weekend's The X Factor auditions."

However, James Walton in the Daily Telegraph was more critical of Rory and Paddy's Great British Adventure saying, "that a sense of almost existential pointlessness had soon settled over the entire programme – a sense not banished by perhaps the least alluring pre-advert announcement in TV history. "Coming up," said Paddy, "Rory's a no-hoper at tiddlywinks.""

Episodes

Series 1: Rory and Paddy's Great British Adventure

Series 2: Rory and Paddy's Even Greater British Adventure

Footnotes

References

2008 British television series debuts
2010 British television series endings
Channel 5 (British TV channel) original programming
British travel television series
British sports television series
English-language television shows